Colm Ó Maonlaí (born 10 December 1966) is an Irish actor, best known for playing Tom Banks in EastEnders from April to November 2002. He has also played roles in The Bill and Doctors. He also had a brief spell playing the tin whistle in Shane MacGowan's band, The Poges

Additionally he has appeared on stage, his first appearance being Coisimo de Medici in a production of Gallelleo Gallellei at The Abby Theatre.

References

1966 births
Living people
Irish male soap opera actors
People educated at Coláiste Eoin